Stuckenia is a genus of flowering aquatic plants. It contains approximately 30 species that grow in shallow water. Pondweed is a common name for plants in this genus.

Description
These herbs have rhizomes but not turions. Tubers can be absent or present. The main difference between Stuckenia and Potamogeton is that the stipule joins the leaf base. When it is pulled the sheath and stipule comes away, similar to a grass sheath and ligule.

Species
 Stuckenia aldanensis 
 Stuckenia amblyophylla 
 Stuckenia arctovaginata 
 Stuckenia austrosibirica 
 Stuckenia borealis 
 Stuckenia bottnica 
 Stuckenia carbonata 
 Stuckenia chakassiensis 
 Stuckenia clavata 
 Stuckenia fennica 
 Stuckenia filiformis (slenderleaf-pondweed) 
 Stuckenia gibbosa 
 Stuckenia helvetica 
 Stuckenia interior 
 Stuckenia macrocarpa 
 Stuckenia marina 
 Stuckenia matyrensis 
 Stuckenia meinshausenii 
 Stuckenia mirabilis 
 Stuckenia mongolica 
 Stuckenia omoloica 
 Stuckenia palaeofiliformis 
 Stuckenia pamirica 
 Stuckenia pectinata (fennel pondweed, sago pondweed) 
 Stuckenia praepectinata 
 Stuckenia praevaginata 
 Stuckenia pseudorostrata 
 Stuckenia punensis 
 Stuckenia sakmarensis 
 Stuckenia striata (broadleaf pondweed) 
 Stuckenia subretusa 
 Stuckenia suecica 
 Stuckenia tenuicarpa 
 Stuckenia vaginata (sheathed pondweed) 
 Stuckenia vaginatoides 
 Stuckenia zosteracea

References

 Börner, C. 1912. Botanisch-systematische Notizen. Abhandl. Naturwiss. Vereine. Bremen 21: 245-282. 
 Doweld, A. B. 2015. On the nomenclature of fossil Stuckenia (Potamogetonaceae). Phytotaxa 236: 86-90.
 Holub, J. 1997. Stuckenia Börner 1912--the correct name for Coleogeton (Potamogetonaceae). Preslia 69: 361-366.
 The INTERNATIONAL FOSSIL PLANT NAMES INDEX|23-Mar-16
 Les, D. H. and R. R. Haynes. 1996. Coleogeton (Potamogetonaceae), a new genus of pondweeds. Novon 6: 389-391.
 Moore, E. 1913. The potamogetons in relation to pond culture. Bull Bureau Fish. 33: 251-291.
 Reveal, J. L. 1977. Potamogetonaceae. In: A. Cronquist et al. 1972+. Intermountain Flora. Vascular Plants of the :* Intermountain West, U.S.A. 4+ vols. New York and London. Vol. 6, pp. 24-42.

Potamogetonaceae
Alismatales genera